FUSC Bois-Guillaume is a French football club based in Bois-Guillaume (Seine-Maritime).

History 
It was founded in 1965. They play at the Parc des Cosmonautes, which has a capacity of 3,000. The colours of the club are green and white.

Honours

External links 
  Official website

Football clubs in France
Association football clubs established in 1965
1965 establishments in France
Sport in Seine-Maritime
Football clubs in Normandy